Neuronetics is a Malvern, PA based, publicly traded company incorporated in Delaware in April 2003, that develops non-invasive treatments for psychiatric disorders that have shown resistance or lack of improvement using traditional medicine. The treatments are based upon neuromodulation technology. 

Neuronetics became "first and only Food and Drug Administration (FDA) approval for the clinical treatment of a specific form of medication-refractory depression using a TMS Therapy device (FDA approval K061053)."

They manufacture a transcranial magnetic stimulation device, NeuroStar. The NeuroStar TMS therapy is delivered via a precisely positioned magnetic coil against the patient's head.

References

External links
 NeuroStar.com: Neuronetics website

2003 establishments in Pennsylvania
American companies established in 2003
Companies based in Chester County, Pennsylvania
Health care companies based in Pennsylvania
Health care companies established in 2003
Manufacturing companies based in Pennsylvania
Manufacturing companies established in 2003
Medical technology companies of the United States
Neurotechnology
Physical psychiatric treatments
Privately held companies based in Pennsylvania
Treatment of depression